The 2019 East Asia Super League season was the third season of the tournament organized by the Asia League Limited. The sole tournament, The Terrific 12 was held from 17–22 September 2019.

Results
The Terrific 12 tournament was held at the Tap Seac Multi-sports Pavilion in Macau from 17 to 22 September. The FIBA-recognized basketball tournament features three clubs from the Chinese Basketball Association of China, four from the B.League of Japan, two from the Korean Basketball League of South Korea and three from the Philippine Basketball Association of the Philippines.

Group stage

Group A

Group B

Group C

Group D

Knockout stage

Semifinal

Third place

Final

Asia League Fest 
As part of The Terrific 12, an evening concert named the Asia League Fest was held on 21 September featuring musical artists from mainland China, Japan, the Philippines, South Korea and Taiwan. The event featured known artists such as MC Jin, James Reid, Jess Connelly, Minzy, Julia Wu, Motherbasss, Blacklist Music and Soler.

References

2018–19 in Asian basketball leagues